John Jenewyne was the member of the Parliament of England for Marlborough for the parliaments of 1362, October 1382, and 1386.

References 

Members of Parliament for Marlborough
English MPs 1362
Tax collectors
Year of birth unknown
Year of death unknown
English MPs October 1382
English MPs 1386